This List of exoplanets discovered in 2018 is a list of confirmed exoplanets that were first observed during 2018.

For exoplanets detected only by radial velocity, the listed value for mass is a lower limit. See Minimum mass for more information.

Specific exoplanet lists

References

2018

exoplanets